is an autobahn in Germany.

It runs from an interchange with the A 1 at Bargteheide to Wankendorf, halfway between Bad Segeberg and Kiel. A northbound extension to Kiel and a southbound extension connecting to the A 39 are being planned. The A 21 will cross the extension of the A 20 near Bad Segeberg.

Exit list 

 

 

 

 

 (Holstein)

 

|}

External links 

21
A021
A021